Loris Baz (born 1 February 1993) is a French motorcycle racer. He is competing for satellite BMW team Bonovo in the 2022 Superbike World Championship, together with Eugene Laverty.

Baz has previously competed in World Superbikes for Ten Kate Racing, the MotoGP series, the FIM Superstock 1000 Championship, the British Superbike Championship and the European Superstock 600 Championship, where he won in 2008.

Career

Superbike World Championship (2012–2014)
Kawasaki Racing Team confirmed Baz for the 2013 Superbike World Championship season.

MotoGP World Championship (2015–2018)
On 4 October 2014, it was announced that Baz would move into MotoGP, with Forward Racing. At Misano in September, Baz achieved his best result with 4th place in changeable conditions. Baz finished his début season with 28 points, and was 17th in the final championship standings.

He made a one-off appearance at the 2018 British GP, replacing the injured Pol Espargaró in the factory KTM team. However, the race was cancelled due to dangerous track conditions following heavy rain and resurfacing.

Return to Superbike (2018–2020)
For the 2018 season Baz returned to the Superbike World Championship riding for the Gulf Althea BMW Racing team.

MotoAmerica Superbike Championship (2021)
On 2 February 2021, American racing series MotoAmerica announced Baz would join the HSBK Racing Ducati team to compete in the United States during 2021, riding a Ducati Panigale V4 R. Baz finished the season in fourth place.

Superbike World Championship (2021–2022)
Baz acted as a replacement for the injured rider Chaz Davies, finishing 6th in race one and 9th in race two at Jerez, Spain in September. After a rider death in World Supersport, there were two main Superbike races only, with no Sprint (short distance) race.

Endurance World Championship
Whilst in Europe and following-on from riding World Superbikes, Baz rode as part of a three-man Moto Ain team on a Yamaha YZF-R1 in the last round of the 2021 FIM Endurance World Championship at Most, in the Czech Republic. Together with Randy De Puniet and Corentin Perolari, the team finished last (21st position) after progress was delayed by mid-race damage to the bike when being ridden by Perolari.

Career statistics

FIM Superstock 1000 Cup

Races by year
(key) (Races in bold indicate pole position, races in italics indicate fastest lap)

British Superbike Championship

Races by year
(key)

Superbike World Championship

By season

Races by year
(key) (Races in bold indicate pole position, races in italics indicate fastest lap)

* Season still in progress.

Grand Prix motorcycle racing

By season

By class

Races by year
(key) (Races in bold indicate pole position, races in italics indicate fastest lap)

References

External links

 
 

1993 births
Living people
French motorcycle racers
Superbike World Championship riders
FIM Superstock 1000 Cup riders
Avintia Racing MotoGP riders
People from Bonneville, Haute-Savoie
KTM Factory Racing MotoGP riders
Sportspeople from Haute-Savoie
MotoGP World Championship riders